Park West and Cherry Orchard railway station is an Iarnród Éireann railway station in Ballyfermot, Dublin, Ireland, serving the Park West and the Cherry Orchard area.

Description
The station opened on 28 July 2008, replacing the former Cherry Orchard and Parkwest Station located nearby. It is located in on the Dublin - Cork main line (the pre-Grouping Great Southern & Western Railway) and is served by South Western Commuter services.

Former Cherry Orchard station
The former station, Cherry Orchard and Parkwest - originally simply called  Cherry Orchard -  opened on 16 May 1994. It was closed on 27 July 2008 as part of the Kildare Route Project, and demolished later in 2008.

Passenger numbers

The station benefited from increased passenger numbers with the opening of the Phoenix Park Tunnel for commuter services in November 2016 allowing direct services to Drumcondra, Connolly Station and Grand Canal Dock bypassing Heuston Station.

See also
 List of railway stations in Ireland

References

External links
Irish Rail Park West and Cherry Orchard Station website

Iarnród Éireann stations in Dublin (city)
Railway stations opened in 2008
2008 establishments in Ireland
Railway stations in the Republic of Ireland opened in the 21st century